Gunnar Martens (born 1940) is a Danish official who was the third High Commissioner of Greenland, holding this position from 1 July 1995 to 31 March 2002. He became a first class knight of the Order of the Dannebrog in 2001.

References

1940 births
Living people
High Commissioners of Greenland